Ki-nam is a Korean unisex given name. Its meaning differs based on the hanja used to write each syllable of the name. There are 68 hanja with the reading "ki" and five hanja with the reading "nam" on the South Korean government's official list of hanja which may be registered for use in given names.

People with this name include:
Paul Roh Ki-nam (1901–1984), Archbishop of Seoul from 1962 to 1967
Kim Ki-nam (born 1926), North Korean politician
Nam Gi-nam (born 1942), South Korean film and cartoon director
Park Ki-nam (박기남, born 1981), South Korean baseball player on the Kia Tigers

See also
List of Korean given names

References

Korean unisex given names